The Substitute Wife may refer to:
 The Substitute Wife (1925 film), an American silent drama directed by Wilfred Noy
 The Substitute Wife (1994 film), a television film directed by Stan Daniels

See also
 Substitute Wife, a 1936 Finnish romantic comedy film directed by Valentin Vaala